Goroka District is a district in the Eastern Highlands Province of Papua New Guinea. It contains the city of Goroka.

The Alekano language is spoken there.

Districts of Eastern Highlands Province